"I Used to Love H.E.R." is a hip hop song by the Chicago-born rapper Common Sense. Released on the 1994 album Resurrection, "I Used to Love H.E.R." has since become one of Common's best known songs. Produced by No I.D., its jazzy beat samples "The Changing World" by George Benson. A music video directed by Chris Halliburton was made for the song. The song is also found on Common's greatest hits album, Thisisme Then.

Overview

Content 
The song uses an extended metaphor, using a woman to represent hip hop music. The acronym "H.E.R" means "Hip-Hop in its Essence is Real""

The song speaks on the direction that hip hop music took during the late 1980s and early 1990s. It specifically refers to the fall of conscious and Afrocentric rap; as well as the rising popularity of West Coast hip hop and G-funk. In the song, Common compares the degradation of a woman with the deterioration of hip hop music after its commercial success forced it into the mainstream. This criticism ignited a feud with West Coast rapper Ice Cube, and helped fuel the growing animosity towards the West Coast hip hop scene during the early stages of the East Coast-West Coast rivalry despite Common hailing from the Midwest.

Acclaim
It is often regarded as one of the greatest hip hop recordings ever. Tiffany Hamilton of AllHipHop.com describes it as a "timeless ode to Hip-Hop [...] that established Common as one of the pioneers in conscious Hip-Hop." Vukile Simelane of RapReviews.com claims it to have one of the "fattest beat[s] ever constructed". Alex Henderson of Allmusic considers it to be the standout track on Resurrection. Duke University professor Mark Anthony Neal considers it to be Common's best single ever. Andrea Duncan-Mao of XXL describes it as a "bittersweet ode to hip-hop" and a "classic" track. Pitchfork's Ryan Dombal considers it to be a "classic hip-hop parable". In 2008, the song was ranked number 69 on VH1's 100 Greatest Songs of Hip Hop. It was ranked number 1 on About.com's Greatest Rap Songs Of All Time.

Significance 
In 1999, "I Used to Love H.E.R." was featured on the Chuck D hosted compilation album Louder Than a Bomb.
In 2002, the opening lines were sung by Taye Diggs and Sanaa Lathan in a park scene for the movie Brown Sugar.
In 2005, Jin released a single named "Top 5 (Dead or Alive)", where he mentions Common and the song :"Trying to figure out the fly chick I discovered... At the same time Common said he used to love her".
In 2007, The Teriyaki Boyz released a song titled "I Still Love H.E.R." featuring Kanye West
 In 2008, on the underground track "Who Killed Hip Hop" Joe Budden references the track stating "But I still love H.E.R. the way Common used to"
 The Game references the song in "Angel (ft. Common)," saying, "So I start Hip-Hop and I understand why Common used to love H.E.R."
In 2009, Brooklyn emcee Israel The ILLa Real stated his debut album's title I Fell In Love With H.E.R. (Hearing Every Rhyme) was inspired by "I Used To Love H.E.R."
The opening lines of "I Used To Love H.E.R." are also used as a reference in the opening lines to Kanye West's song "Homecoming".
In the Clipse song "Showing Out", a reference is made saying "Common loved H.E.R., I wish I'd never met her."
In 2011, New Jersey singer Eric Roberson used the opening lines of "I Used to Love H.E.R." on his song "Strangers" from his 2011 album Mister Nice Guy.
In 2012, East Coast rap group Pro Era made a song "I Still Love H.E.R." inspired by "I Used to Love H.E.R."
In 2014 Christian hip-hop and spoken word artist Propaganda rapped the opening lines of "I Used To Love H.E.R." on his song "I Ain't Gave Up on You Yet".
In 2019, Common released an album titled Let Love, which included the song "HER Love", in reference to his 1994 classic.

Remixes 
9th Wonder, a producer from North Carolina, remixed "I Used to Love H.E.R." and released the remix as a single. Independent record label Boom Bap Records distributed the single, which contained "The 6th Sense" as a b-side.
Jazz band Vitamin Jazz covered "I Used to Love H.E.R." on their 2006 album Commonication: The Smooth Jazz Sessions to the Music of Common.
Japanese hip hop group Teriyaki Boyz and American rapper Kanye West made a song called "I Still Love H.E.R." which alludes to "I Used to Love H.E.R.".
Korean hip hop rapper The Quiett has a song called Give It to H.E.R. in his 3rd album, which also is related to "I Used to Love H.E.R." and uses a similar metaphor.
Kanye West raps a first verse that pays homage to the song in his song "Homecoming".
American rapper Sivion also made a song named "I Still Love H.E.R." for his 2006 album Spring of the Songbird.
Taiwanese hip hop group TriPoets wrote a song named "Used to Love Her" which alludes to "I Used to Love H.E.R.".
The song was featured on Team Teamwork's mashup album, The Ocarina of Rhyme. The album featured several hip-hop songs remixed with music from Nintendo's Legend of Zelda video game series.
Japanese DJ, DJ Deckstream has remixed this song on his album "Sweet 90's Blues" along with multiple other hit songs from the decade.
Murs & 9th Wonder made a cover of the song entitled "I Used to Luv H.E.R.(Again)" featured on their 2010 album Fornever.
Tom Caruana has remixed this song for his 2011 album "Okayplayer: The Bollywood Remake" along with multiple other hit songs from Okayplayer Allstars.
In 2011, drum and bass musician Mutt released track "I Used To" based on main tune from this song.
In 2013, Common released the sequel with J. Period entitled "The Next Chapter (Still Love H.E.R)"
2014 David Gold of Yompton Radio and Ride Records, USA records a remix for Warner Brothers, Mousse demo. Live from the Bophouse studios; Mixed by Da Bopman @TheAudiologists, Portland; Youngstown A city formerly known as Little Chicago for its gangland style car-bombings in the 1950s and 60s.
In 2014, Scholars Ent. released track "H.E.R." featuring The Other Guys, D-Sisive, Taurean MC of The Caravan and Sadat X of Brand Nubian.

Music video
The music video was filmed on September 20, 1994, and released later that year. It shows clips of Common's home of Southside Chicago and a woman, who is the main subject of the video because of the extended metaphor. It shows how she "became a gangster" when this woman is seen with two other ghetto-looking women in allusion to the rise of gangsta rap.

Track listing

A-side
 "I Used to Love H.E.R." (4:29)
 "I Used to Love H.E.R. (Instrumental)" (4:43)
 "I Used to Love H.E.R. (Acapella)"

B-side
 "Communism (2:16)"
 "Communism (Instrumental)" (2:39)
 "Communism (Acapella)"

Chart positions

See also
List of Common songs

References

External links
 

1994 singles
Common (rapper) songs
Song recordings produced by No I.D.
Songs written by Common (rapper)
Songs written by No I.D.
1994 songs
Relativity Records singles
Jazz rap songs
Songs about hip hop